A jig is a type of custom-made tool used to control the location and/or motion of parts or other tools.

Description

A jig's primary purpose is to provide repeatability, accuracy, and interchangeability in the manufacturing of products. 

An example of a jig is when a key is duplicated; the original is used as a jig so the new key can have the same path as the old one. Since the advent of automation and computer numerical controlled (CNC) machines, jigs are often not required because the tool path is digitally programmed and stored in memory. Jigs may be made for reforming plastics.

Jigs or templates have been known long before the industrial age. There are many types of jigs, and each one is custom-tailored to do a specific job.

Drill jig
A drill jig is a type of jig that expedites repetitive hole center location on multiple interchangeable parts by acting as a template to guide the twist drill or other boring device into the precise location of each intended hole center. In metalworking practice, typically a hardened drill bushing lines each hole on the jig plate to keep the tool from damaging the jig.

Drill jigs started falling into disuse with the invention of the jig borer.

Since the widespread penetration of the manufacturing industry by CNC machine tools, in which servo controls are capable of moving the tool to the correct location automatically, the need for drill jigs (and for the jobs of the drill press operators who used them) is much less than it used to be.

PCB jig

Printed circuit board (PCB) jigs are used to test PCBs. They have a dump board inside the jig which can find faults in the PCBs.

Jewelry jig
A jig used in making jewelry, a specific type of jig, is a plate or open frame for holding work and helping to shape jewelry components made out of wire or small sheets of metal. A jig in the jewelry making application is used to help establish a pattern for use in shaping the wire or sheets of metal. In the jewelry application, the shaping of the metal is done by hand or with simple hand tools like a hammer.

See also
Jig grinder
Staircase jig
Sharpening jig
Tapering jig

References

Bibliography

Woodworking jigs
Woodworking tools
Metalworking tools